Life and Times is the ninth solo album from former Hüsker Dü and Sugar frontman Bob Mould.

Reception

Initial critical response to Life And Times was positive. At Metacritic, which assigns a normalized rating out of 100 to reviews from mainstream critics, the album has received an average score of 73, based on 8 reviews.

Track listing 
All tracks written by Bob Mould.
"Life and Times" - 4:11
"The Breach" - 3:45  
"City Lights (Days Go By)" - 3:45  
"MM 17" - 3:39  
"Argos" - 2:03  
"Bad Blood Better" - 3:46  
"Wasted World" - 4:00  
"Spiraling Down" - 3:08  
"I'm Sorry, Baby, But You Can't Stand in My Light Anymore" - 3:11  
"Lifetime" - 4:46

Personnel
Bob Mould - vocals, guitars, bass, keyboards, percussion, programming, producer, mixing, layout
Jon Wurster - drums
Frank Marchand - drum recording
Jim Wilson - mastering
Tom D. Kline - layout
Micheal Brodbeck - photography
Jordan Kurland - management
Josh Grier - legal

Charts

References

2008 albums
Anti- (record label) albums
Bob Mould albums
Albums produced by Bob Mould